Nectandra parviflora is a species of plant in the family Lauraceae. It is found in Ecuador and Peru.

References

parviflora
Vulnerable plants
Taxonomy articles created by Polbot
Trees of Ecuador
Trees of Peru